Ohain may refer to:

 Ohain, Belgium
 Ohain, Nord, France
 Hans von Ohain (1911–1998), one of the inventors of the jet engine